The Hong Kong Women's Sevens held the first women's international rugby sevens tournament in 1997, and has since become an annual event. The 2020 edition marked the start of a new era for the Hong Kong Women's Sevens. For the first time, the tournament will be an official event in the World Rugby Women's Sevens Series. The 2020 and 2021 tournaments were cancelled due to the COVID-19 pandemic.

History 
The Hong Kong Sevens included a women's tournament for the first time under chairwoman Maria Allen and at the urging of USA 7s coach, Emil Signes. Over the next decade the number of tournaments grew, with almost every region developing regular championships. This reached its zenith with 2009's inaugural women's tournament for the Rugby World Cup Sevens, shortly followed by the announcement that women's rugby sevens would be included in the Olympics from 2016.

New Zealand representative teams have competed in Hong Kong as early as 1997, winning the competition in 1997 and 1999. In 2000 New Zealand sent its first official Women's Sevens team to the Hong Kong Sevens.

Past champions
The following are details of all Hong Kong women's international tournaments played since 1997, listed chronologically with the earliest first, with all result details, where known.

Key:Dark blue line indicates a tournament included in the World Rugby Women's Sevens Series.

Notes:

2001 
Venue/Date: Hong Kong, 28–30 March 2001 (Source Hong Kong Union)  Summarised

Group stages
POOL A

New Zealand 31–0 Samoa
Sweden 29–0 Kazakhstan
Samoa 39–7 Japan
New Zealand 55–0 Sweden
Kazakhstan 39–0 Japan
Samoa 32–5 Sweden
New Zealand 45–0 Kazakhstan
Sweden 19–7 Japan
Samoa 15–10 Kazakhstan
New Zealand 45–0 Japan
POOL B

USA 17–0 Australia
England 27–0 Netherlands
USA 33–0 Hong Kong
England 27–0 Australia
Netherlands 20–0 Hong Kong
USA 10–0 England
Australia 45–0 Netherlands
England 46–0 Hong Kong
USA 26–0 Netherlands
Australia 43–0 Hong Kong

POOL C – Asian Group

Singapore 7–5 Thailand
Arabian Gulf 22–5 Thailand
Singapore 7–5 Arabian Gulf
China 19–17 Arabian Gulf
China 20–0 Singapore
China 5–5 Thailand

Classification stages
Asian Quarter Finals
Hong Kong 17–0 Arabian Gulf
Kazakhstan 29–0 Thailand
Japan 10–0 Singapore
Plate Semi Finals
Australia 31–0 Sweden
Kazakhstan 24–0 Netherlands
Asian Semi Finals
Hong Kong 19–5 Japan
Kazakhstan 48–0 China
Cup Semi Finals
USA 10–0 Samoa
New Zealand 25–0 England
Asian 3rd Place
China 19–5 Japan
FINALS

Bowl Final
Hong Kong 25–12 Japan
Plate Final
Australia 41–12 Kazakhstan
Overall 3rd Place
Samoa 25–0 England
Asian Final
Kazakhstan 45–0 Hong Kong
Cup Final
New Zealand 22–0 USA

Additional Info
The tournament also incorporated an Asian Group with Kazakhstan, Hong Kong and Japan also playing in the main competition.  It is possible that the first matches for the Asian teams were knockout to see who would proceed into both the Asian Semi Finals and the main competition but this is not confirmed.  If this is the case China did not play a knockout game but went on to win the Asian sub group and claim a place in the semi finals.

2002 
Venue/Date: Hong Kong, 21–22 March 2002 (Source Hong Kong Union)

Group matches
Pool A

Aotearoa Maori New Zealand 50–0 Thailand
Hong Kong 19–7 Arabian Gulf
Aotearoa Maori New Zealand 43–0 Hong Kong
Arabian Gulf 0–47 Aotearoa Maori New Zealand
Hong Kong 31–0 Thailand
Thailand 12–17 Arabian Gulf
Pool B

USA 32–0 China
Kazakhstan 36–0 Japan
USA 12–10 Kazakhstan
Japan 0–34 USA
Kazakhstan 24–0 China
China 10–5 Japan

Classification stages 
Bowl Semi Final
Arabian Gulf 19–7 Japan
Thailand 0–5 China
Cup Semi Final
New Zealand 19–0 Kazakhstan
Hong Kong 0–15 USA
7th 8th
Japan 12–10 Thailand
Bowl Final
Arabian Gulf 22–5 China
Plate and Asian Championship Final
Hong Kong 0–55 Kazakhstan
Cup Final
New Zealand 14–7 USA

2003 
Venue/Date: Hong Kong, 27–28 March 2003 (Source Hong Kong Union)

Participants: England, Aotearoa Maori New Zealand, USA, Fiji and 4 from the preceding Asian tournament.

The Fiji women's team made their first international appearance since 1997.

Group stages
POOL A

Aotearoa Maori New Zealand 26–12 England
USA 38–0 Fiji
Aotearoa Maori New Zealand 38–0 Fiji
England 5–0 USA
Aotearoa Maori New Zealand 22–0 USA
England 27–0 Fiji
POOL B – Asian Qualifiers

Classification stages 
Cup Quarter Finals
England 27–0 Arabian Gulf
Kazakhstan 27–5 Fiji
USA 29–0 Hong Kong
Aotearoa Maori New Zealand 46–0 Thailand
Shield Semi Finals
Fiji 34–0 Arabian Gulf
Hong Kong 19–5 Thailand
Cup Semi Finals
England 19–5 Kazakhstan
Aotearoa Maori New Zealand 17–5 USA
Shield Final
Arabian Gulf 24–5 Thailand (also reported as 24–7)
Bowl Final
Fiji 34–12 Hong Kong
Plate Final
Kazakhstan 14–7 USA (Kazakhstan, as highest placed Asian team, were declared Asian champions)
Cup Final
Aotearoa Maori New Zealand 27–0 England

2004 
Venue/Date: Hong Kong, March 2004 (Source Hong Kong Rugby Union)

Participants: Aotearoa Maori New Zealand, Australia, China, Hong Kong, Kazakhstan, Singapore, Sri Lanka, Thailand, USA (with Macao and Hong Kong Barbarians as showcase teams)

Group stages
Pool A

Aotearoa Maori New Zealand 14–5 Australia
Kazakhstan 24–0 Hong Kong
Aotearoa Maori New Zealand 56–0 Thailand
Australia 12–0 Kazakhstan
Hong Kong 29–7 Thailand
Aotearoa Maori New Zealand 35–0 Kazakhstan
Australia 64–0 Thailand
Aotearoa Maori New Zealand 38–0 Hong Kong
Kazakhstan 41–0 Thailand
Australia 37–0 Hong Kong
Pool B

USA 35–0 Japan
Sri Lanka 7–10 Singapore
China 0–36 USA
Japan 32–0 Sri Lanka
Singapore 10–7 China
USA 29–0 Sri Lanka
Japan 31–0 China
USA 57–0 Singapore
Sri Lanka 12–0 China
Japan 31–7 Singapore

Classification stages 
Macao v Hong Kong Barbarians (Exhibition – three games played)

4th and 5th placed teams

Hong Kong 29–0 Sri Lanka
Thailand 26–5 China
Hong Kong 0–5 Thailand
Sri Lanka 22–12 China
Hong Kong 29–0 China
Sri Lanka 12–22 Thailand

1st, 2nd and 3rd placed teams
Group A

Aotearoa Maori New Zealand 38–0 Japan
Aotearoa Maori New Zealand 53–0 Singapore
Japan 19–0 Singapore
Group B

USA 0–17 Australia
USA 0–5 Kazakhstan
Australia 20–0 Kazakhstan

Bowl Final 
Singapore 0–68 USA
Plate Final
Japan 5–29 Kazakhstan
Cup Final
Aotearoa Maori New Zealand 10–0 Australia

2005
Venue/Date: Hong Kong, March 2005 (Source Hong Kong Union)

Group stages
Group A

Aotearoa Maori New Zealand 12–7 USA
Hong Kong 17–17 Singapore
Aotearoa Maori New Zealand 38–0 Hong Kong
USA 47–0 Singapore
Aotearoa Maori New Zealand 48–0 Singapore
USA 38–0 Hong Kong
Group B

Australia 20–0 Japan
China 19–12 Thailand
Australia 19–0 China
Japan 38–0 Thailand
Australia 47–0 Thailand
Japan 5–5 China

Classification stages 
Bowl/Shield Semi Finals
Singapore 10–22 China
Hong Kong 7–15 Thailand
Cup/Plate Semi Finals
USA 5–10 Australia
Aotearoa Maori New Zealand 43–0 Japan
Shield Final
Singapore 0–34 Hong Kong
Bowl Final
China 24–7 Thailand
Plate Final
USA 31–7 Japan
Cup Final
Aotearoa Maori New Zealand 19–12 Australia

2006 
Venue/Date: Hong Kong March 2006 (Source Hong Kong Union) Summarised (but with a number of missing games)

Group games 
Aotearoa Maori New Zealand 7–5 China
Aotearoa Maori New Zealand 38–0 Japan U-23
China beat Japan U-23

Classification stages 
Cup Quarter Finals
Aotearoa Maori Zealand 45–0 Netherlands
Kazakhstan 14–12 China
Australia 63-? Thailand
USA 50-? Singapore
Vase Semi Finals
Japan U-23 5-? Hong Kong
Sri Lanka 5-? Guam
Bowl Semi Finals
Netherlands 14–7 China
Thailand 5–5 Singapore
Cup Semi Finals
Aotearoa Maori New Zealand 25–7 Kazakhstan
Australia 15–0 USA
Spoon Final
Japan U-23 24–0 Guam
Vase Final
Hong Kong 26–5 Sri Lanka
Shield Final
China 50–0 Thailand
Bowl Final
Netherlands 36–0 Singapore
Plate Final
USA 31–0 Kazakhstan
Cup Final
Aotearoa Maori New Zealand 19–12 Australia

2007 
Date/Venue: Hong Kong, 29–30 March 2007 (Source Hong Kong Union)

Group stages
POOL A

Aotearoa Maori New Zealand 64–0 Hong Kong
Aotearoa Maori New Zealand 21–0 Canada
Canada 38–0 Hong Kong
POOL B

Australia 7–5 Kazakhstan
Australia 31–0 Arabian Gulf
Kazakhstan 24–7 Arabian Gulf

POOL C

USA 22–0 Papua New Guinea
USA 38–0 Thailand
Thailand 38–0 Papua New Guinea
POOL D

China 32–0 Singapore
China 25–0 Japan U-23
Singapore 12–7 Japan U-23

Classification stages 
Cup Quarter Finals
Australia 49–0 Thailand
USA 12–5 Kazakhstan
Aotearoa Maori New Zealand 51–0 Singapore
China 15–10 Canada
Vase Semi Finals
Hong Kong 12–5 Japan U-23
Arabian Gulf 17–0 Papua New Guinea
Bowl Semi Finals
Thailand 0–36 Kazakhstan
Singapore 0–47 Canada
Cup Semi Finals
USA 0–19 Australia
Aotearoa Maori New Zealand 38–0 China
Spoon Final
Japan U-23 31–0 Papua New Guinea
Vase Final
Hong Kong 12–14 Arabian Gulf
Shield Final
Thailand 24–0 Singapore
Bowl Final
Kazakhstan 21–19 Canada
Plate Final
USA 26–5 China
Final
Aotearoa Maori New Zealand 10–0 Australia

2008 
Played 27 and 28 March at Hong Kong (So Kon Po stadium, final at the International Stadium) (Source HK Rugby and South China Morning Post) (Summarised)

Pool A: USA, Netherlands (last took part in 2006), Hong Kong
Pool B: Kazakhstan (current Asian champs), Fiji (last took part in 2003), France (debut)
Pool C: China, Thailand, Japan
Pool D: Canada, Singapore, Arabian Gulf

New Zealand did not defend the tournament that they have never lost and Australia were also a noted absentee.
Pool games were followed by a range of classification games.
Fiji withdrew late on and Papua New Guinea stepped in avoiding the need for a "select" team (they took part in 2007)

Group stages
POOL A

USA 36–7 Netherlands
USA 33–0 Hong Kong
Netherlands 20–17 Hong Kong
POOL B

Kazakhstan 22–0 Papua New Guinea
France 17–7 Kazakhstan
France 29–0 Papua New Guinea

POOL C

China 26–0 Thailand
China 15–7 Japan
Japan 22–0 Thailand
POOL D

Canada 56–0 Singapore
Canada 43–0 Arabian Gulf
Arabian Gulf 38–0 Singapore

Classification stages 

Cup Quarter Finals

Canada 35–14 Netherlands

Kazakhstan 12–7 China

USA 45–0 Arabian Gulf

France 15–7 Japan

9th to 12th Semi Finals

Hong Kong 15–0 Singapore

Papua New Guinea 0–29 Thailand

Bowl (5th to 8th) Semi Finals

Netherlands 5–5 China (China win on try countback)

Arabian Gulf 0–10 Japan

Cup Semi Finals

Canada 26–0 Kazakhstan

USA 5–0 France

11th Place

Singapore 5–17 Papua New Guinea

9th Place

Hong Kong 15–7 Thailand

7th Place

Netherlands 19–0 Arabian Gulf

Bowl Final

China 17–7 Japan

Plate Final

France 24–0 Kazakhstan

Cup Final

USA 21–7 Canada

2009 
27 March 2009 at Hong Kong.

Group Stages
Pool A

Thailand 12–0 Papua New Guinea
Hong Kong 5–15 Japan U-23
China 36–0 Papua New Guinea
Japan U-23 0–33 Thailand
Hong Kong 0–29 China
Japan U-23 10–22 Papua New Guinea
China 36–7 Thailand
Papua New Guinea 7–12 Hong Kong
China 21–0 Japan U-23
Thailand 35–0 Hong Kong
Pool B

Guam 7–26 Tunisia
Singapore 0–29 Arabian Gulf
Australia 29–0 Tunisia
Arabian Gulf 32–0 Guam
Singapore 0–53 Australia
Tunisia 19–12 Arabian Gulf
Australia 57–0 Guam
Tunisia 14–12 Singapore
Guam 12–12 Singapore
Australia 38–0 Arabian Gulf

Classification Games 

9th place
Hong Kong 7–0 Guam

7th place
Japan U-23 7–0 Singapore

Bowl Final
Arabian Gulf 12–14 Papua New Guinea

Plate Final
Thailand 22–7 Tunisia

Cup Final
Australia 24–7 China

2010 
26–27 March 2010 at Hong Kong.

Group Stages
Pool A

Malaysia 20–0 Papua New Guinea
China 20–0 Papua New Guinea
Malaysia 0–46 China

Pool B

Arabian Gulf 26–17 Singapore
Aussie Amazons 60–0 Singapore
Arabian Gulf 0–59 Aussie Amazons

Quarter-finals
China 38–5 Arabian Gulf
Malaysia 0–38 Aussie Amazons
Aotearoa Maori 47–0 Hong Kong
Thailand 14–17 Kazakhstan

Semi-finals
Aotearoa Maori 5–12 Aussie Amazons
Kazakhstan 7–14 China

Final
Aussie Amazons 26–0 China
Pool C

Japan U-23 5–12 Hong Kong
Thailand 22–12 Hong Kong
Japan U-23 7–24 Thailand

Pool D

Kazakhstan 24–12 South African Tuks
Aotearoa Maori 54–0 South African Tuks
Kazakhstan 7–26 Aotearoa Maori

Plate semi-finals
Thailand beat Arabian Gulf
Hong Kong 41–0 Malaysia

Plate final
Hong Kong 14–17 Thailand

Bowl semi-finals
Singapore beat South African Tuks
Japan U-23 14-0 Papua New Guinea

Bowl final
Japan U-23 35-7 Singapore

2011 
25 March 2011 at Hong Kong.

Group Stages
Pool A

 0–56 
 14–36 
 5–17 
 66–0 
 20–28 
 0–12 
 53–0 
 5–15 
 17–24 
 7–47 

9th place
 10–24 

7th place
 5–22 

Bowl final
 31–5 
Pool B

 0–47 
 0–31 
 31–5 
 64–0 
 7–28 
 7–40 
 63–0 
 12–17 
 0–29 
 7–26 

Plate final
 12–7 

Cup final
 14–28

2012 
IRB Women's Challenge Cup
23–24 March 2012 at Hong Kong.

Pool A

 45–0 
 0–29 
 24–5 

Pool C

 28–21 
 19–5 
 52–0 

Bowl semi-finals (9th/12th)
 22–0 
 14–12 

11th/12th
 33–0 

Bowl final (9th/10th)
 19–7 

Plate semi finals (5th/8th)
 21–12 
 0–14 
Pool B

 31–7 
 35–5 
 38–0 

Pool D

 8–5 
 45–0 
 20–0 

7th/8th place
 5 – 0 

Plate final (5th/6th)
 7–12 

Cup semi finals (1st/4th)
 12–22 
 33–0 

Cup final
 10–15

2013 
22 March 2013 at Hong Kong.

Pool A

 42–0 International Select
 40–5 International Select
 19–12 

Pool C

 19–14 
 19–7 
 7–24 

Bowl semi-finals (9th/12th)
International Select 36–10 Singapore
Hong Kong 5–33 Ireland

11th/12th
Singapore 5–40 Hong Kong

Bowl final (9th/10th)
International Select 0–28 Ireland

Plate semi finals (5th/8th)
Kazakhstan 17–15 China
Japan 5–26 South Africa
Pool B

 0–33 
 5–24 
 54–0 

Pool D

 66–0 
 50–0 
 31–10 

7th/8th place
China 14–5 Japan

Plate final (5th/6th)
Kazakhstan 5–26 South Africa

Cup semi finals (1st/4th)
Australia 17–5 Netherlands
Canada 21–0 France

3rd place
Netherlands 14–0 France

Cup final
Australia 0–29 Canada

2014 
28 March 2014 at Hong Kong.

Pool A

Hong Kong 5 : 19 Canada
Kazakhstan 12 : 7 Hong Kong
Canada 33 : 0 Kazakhstan

Pool C

France 35: 0 Kenya
China 24 : 7 Kenya
France 19 : 19 China

Bowl semi-finals (9th/12th)
Hong Kong 50 : 0 Singapore
Kenya 12 : 5 Papua New Guinea

11th/12th
Singapore 5 : 22 Papua New Guinea

Bowl final (9th/10th)
Hong Kong 33 : 7 Kenya

Plate semi finals (5th/8th)
Kazakhstan 24 : 14 Ireland
China 19 : 12 Brazil
Pool B

Brazil 19 : 0 Papua New Guinea
South Africa 29 : 0 Papua New Guinea
Brazil 7 : South Africa 19

Pool D

Ireland 31 : 0 Singapore
Japan 36 : 7 Singapore
Ireland 12 : 27 Japan

7th/8th place
Ireland 7 : 20 Brazil

Plate final (5th/6th)
Kazakhstan 12 : 7 China

Cup semi finals (1st/4th)
Canada 38 : 0 Japan
France 19 : 5 South Africa

3rd place
Japan 10 : 28 South Africa

Cup final
Canada 24 : France 0

See also
 Hong Kong Sevens (men's tournament)

Notes and references

 
World Rugby Women's Sevens Series tournaments
International rugby union competitions hosted by Hong Kong
Women's rugby union competitions in Asia
Women's rugby union competitions for national teams
Rugby sevens competitions in Asia
Recurring sporting events established in 1997
1997 establishments in Hong Kong